Xyris straminea is a small annual tufted species of plant in the Xyridaceae family. It can be found in seasonally wet soils and inselbergs in Tropical Africa.

Description 
Linear leaves, sometimes rugulose at the base and weakly curved towards the apex. Inflorescence, mostly ovoid or ellipsoid spikes distinguished by the presence of ovate pale brown bracts, between 4.5 - 6.5 mm.

Distribution 
Widespread in Tropical West Africa where it often grows on wet rocky slopes, rock pools and a few other seasonally wet habitats.

References 

Flora of West Tropical Africa
straminea